Andrew M. McIntosh   is a UK academic psychiatrist. He is Professor of Biological Psychiatry at the Centre for Clinical Brain Sciences, University of Edinburgh, and is an affiliate member of the Centre for Genomic and Experimental Medicine at the University of Edinburgh. The main focus of his research is using genomic and neuroimaging approaches to better understand the causes and causal consequences of Major Depressive Disorder.

Education
He completed his intercalated BSc in Medical Science and MBChB (medical qualification) at the University of Aberdeen before completing House Officer posts at Aberdeen Royal Infirmary. He then completed his psychiatric training in South East Scotland, mainly at the Royal Edinburgh Hospital, before gaining MRCPsych in 2000. He has an MPhil (Psychiatry) and MD (Psychiatry, 2004) from the University of Edinburgh and a MSc in Applied Statistics from Edinburgh Napier University. He has held an MRC Clinical Training Fellowship, a Health Foundation/Academy of Medical Sciences Clinician Scientist Fellowship and a Scottish Funding Council Senior Clinical Fellowship

Career
McIntosh is co-chair of the Major Depressive Disorder Working Group of the Psychiatric Genomics Consortium. with Cathryn Lewis. He is chair of the Generation Scotland Mental Expert Working Group and also Chair's the MQ Mental Health Data Science Group. He is currently a member of the Wellcome Trust Basic Sciences Interview Committee. In 2012 he was made a Fellow of the Royal College of Psychiatrists

Selected publications

References 

Living people
Alumni of the University of Aberdeen
Alumni of the University of Edinburgh Medical School
British psychiatrists
Fellows of the Royal College of Psychiatrists
Year of birth missing (living people)
Fellows of the Academy of Medical Sciences (United Kingdom)